The 1970 1000km of Nürburgring was an endurance race held at the Nürburgring Nordschleife, Nürburg, West Germany on May 31, 1970. It was the seventh round of the 1970 World Sportscar Championship season.

Pre-race
The race weekend was marred by the fatal accident of Finnish driver Hans Laine in a Porsche 908/02. While attempting to qualify for the race at the end of Saturday's qualifying session, Laine damaged one of the front sections of his car; and while he was on the Dottinger Hohe straight going at full speed over one of the humps near the Antonius Bridge, his 908/02 flew into the air, did a full backflip and landed back on the track and rolled a number of times. Although Laine was alive and conscious after the accident, fuel was leaking and Laine could not get out of the car. Track marshals were able to get to the wrecked Porsche, but then the car burst into flames. The marshals only had small extinguishers that was not enough to put out the inferno and Laine perished in the fire. He was 25, and was survived by his wife and 5-month year old daughter; he was one of 6 racers to die at the Nürburgring that year. Laine's co-driver, Dutchman Gijs van Lennep had a similar incident at the same place on the track, although he was able to avoid causing any damage to the car. The racing team Laine drove for withdrew another one of its entries, a Porsche 917K but a Porsche 911 driven by Finnish rally driver Pauli Tovionen and entered by Laine's team won the GT's with an engine larger than 2 liters class.

It was agreed upon by John Wyer and Porsche that the works teams would use the 908/03, the car used at the Targa Florio. The light and nimble 908/03 was better suited to the twisty and demanding Nürburgring than the big and powerful 917K. Two were run by John Wyer's team and two were run by Porsche Salzburg.

One of the works Ferrari 512S Spyders, entered and to be driven by Jacky Ickx and Peter Schetty crashed in practice; neither driver took part in the race. This just about proved to be fatal for Ferrari, because Ickx was considered to be the best Nürburgring driver in the world at that time, next to Formula One world champion Jackie Stewart. Even with the experienced John Surtees who knew the long circuit well and had much success at the challenging mountain circuit in the past, things did not look good for Ferrari- as most of the works Porsche drivers- including Jo Siffert, Brian Redman, Hans Herrmann and Vic Elford were all known to be Nürburgring specialists and were very fast around the circuit.

Qualifying was dominated by works Porsches. They took the first four positions on the grid with the pole position time only a second slower than the time set by Ickx for the 1969 German Grand Prix; pole position went to the Jo Siffert/Brian Redman car, followed by Pedro Rodriguez/Leo Kinnunen, Vic Elford/Kurt Ahrens Jr., and then Hans Herrmann/Richard Attwood. They were followed by a works Alfa Romeo T33/3 of Rolf Stommelen/Piers Courage, and the two works Ferrari 512S Spyders of Ignazio Giunti/Arturo Merzario and John Surtees/Nino Vaccarella.

Race
At the start Rodriguez went ahead and Siffert, the pole sitter, was also overtaken by Giunti's Ferrari. This allowed Rodriguez to get a good lead. At the second lap Siffert, who had a hard time getting around Giunti and even waved his fist at him, managed to overtake him and endeavoured to regain first place. He was faster at the Ring and eroded Rodriguez's lead by about 1,5 seconds per lap. At lap 8 Siffert went ahead, but Rodriguez answered back with a best lap (new prototype record). Siffert managed to gain about 8 seconds on Rodriguez, before the pit stops. When pitstops came around, Rodriguez handed off his car to Kinnunen and Siffert to Redman; but the Siffert-Redman car was delayed and went back to second place. Redman went after Kinnunen and in two laps was poised to overtake him; under pressure Kinnunen, who had been affected by his friend Hans Laine's death the day before, crashed his 908/03 after going over a jump at the 14 kilometer mark (near the Karrusell), flipping in the air and Redman went right underneath his crashing teammate. This put the Siffert/Redman car into the lead, but by the end of the 22nd lap, Redman brought his 908/03 due to faltering oil pressure. The engine then failed due to lack of oil, and the Elford/Ahrens Jr. 908/03 took the lead, ran without a hitch and went on to win the race; followed by the other 908/03 of Herrmann/Attwood and the remaining works Ferrari of Surtees/Vaccarella. The one competitive works Alfa Romeo of Rolf Stommelen/Piers Courage went out after 11 laps with a broken shock absorber.

With this victory at their home event, Porsche claimed the World Sportscar Championship over Ferrari.

This would be the last ever major international race on the original Nürburgring with no safety features on it. For the next year's race, the Nordschleife was rebuilt, which included making the surface smoother and lining the circuit with Armco and adding run-off areas wherever possible. The German Grand Prix that year was originally supposed to be at the Nurburgring that year, but with Laine's accident being the third racing fatality at the Ring in 1970 and the deaths of 2 other Formula One drivers, the Formula One circus moved temporarily to Hockenheim, which prompted the Ring to be rebuilt. 3 more drivers and a motorcyclist were to die at the Ring that year- bring the total death tally for the circuit in 1970 up to a very dubious seven in one year.

Official results

Did Not Finish

Statistics
Pole position: #24 John Wyer Automotive Engineering Porsche 908/03 (Jo Siffert/Brian Redman) - 7:43.3 (110.334 mph/177.566 km/h)
Fastest lap: #25 John Wyer Automotive Engineering Porsche 908/03 (Pedro Rodriguez)- 7:50.4 (108.590 mph/174.758 km/h)
Time taken for winning car to cover scheduled distance: 6 hours, 5 minutes and 21.2 seconds
Average Speed: 165.003 km/h (102.528 mph)
Weather conditions: Cloudy, overcast

References

Nurburgring
Nurburgring
6 Hours of Nürburgring